Proscalops is an extinct genus of insect-eating mammal. Formerly placed in the defunct order Insectivora, it is now placed with the Eulipotyphla. The first and most numerous Proscalops fossils were found in the Sharps Formation of South Dakota, near Wounded Knee. Other samples have been found in the Brule Formation of South Dakota, the Deep River Formation of Montana, and in Wyoming.

References

Prehistoric Eulipotyphla
Extinct mammals of North America
Oligocene mammals
Fossil taxa described in 1901
Prehistoric placental genera